Nasim Adabi (born September 8, 1976) is an Iranian actress. She is best known for her roles in Shahrzad (2015–2018) and Golshifteh (2018). She has received various accolades, including a Fajr International Theater Festival Award, in addition to nomination for a Hafez Award.

Filmography

Awards and nominations 

 Best Actor in Fajr Theatre Festival 2016
 Best Actor in Fajr Theatre Festival 2015
 Best Actor in Fajr Theatre Festival 2011
 Best Actor in Fajr Theatre Festival 2009
 Award for best actress for playing in "Puppet called Scarek" from student festival, 2002
 Award for best actor for playing in "Puppet called Scarek" from The Festival of The Bar, 2002
 Award for best actress for playing in "Acacalaureate" screening from Ardabil Festival, 1996
 Hafez Statue tteyz received best tv comedy actress from 19th Hafez Celebration for Golshifteh Collection 2019

See also 
 Iranian women
 Cinema of Iran

References

External links
 
 

1976 births
Living people
Iranian actresses
People from Tehran
Actresses from Tehran
Iranian film actresses
Iranian stage actresses
Iranian television actresses
21st-century Iranian actresses
Islamic Azad University, Central Tehran Branch alumni